Artzentales (Artzandaritz) is a municipality in the province of Biscay, in the autonomous community of Basque Country, northern Spain..

References

External links
 ARCENTALES in the Bernardo Estornés Lasa - Auñamendi Encyclopedia (Euskomedia Fundazioa) 

Municipalities in Biscay